Daniel Alan Kerr (born 16 May 1983) is a former Australian rules footballer who played for the West Coast Eagles in the Australian Football League (AFL). He played 220 games for the club between 2001 and 2013, as a hard-running inside midfielder.

Kerr was born and raised in Perth, Western Australia. His father Roger also played professional football, while his sister Samantha plays professional soccer. Kerr was recruited to West Coast with the 18th pick in the 2000 National Draft. He finished runner-up in the 2001 AFL Rising Star, and in 2003, aged 20, won the Goal of the Year award. Kerr placed in the top three of the Brownlow Medal in three consecutive seasons from 2005 to 2007, notably finishing runner-up to teammate Ben Cousins in 2005 by a single vote. He played in a premiership in 2006 (after a grand final loss the previous year), and was also named in the 2007 All-Australian team. Kerr suffered from injuries later in his career, eventually retiring from AFL football at the end of the 2013 season.

Early life and family
Kerr was born in Perth, Western Australia, to Roxanne (née Regan) and Roger Kerr. His mother was born in Australia, while his father was born to an Anglo-Indian family in Calcutta. Roger played professional football in the 1980s, appearing for East Fremantle in the WAFL and briefly also for Port Adelaide in the SANFL. Kerr's younger sister Samantha also grew up playing football, but switched to soccer at the age of twelve. Sam grew into one of the world's top players, captaining Australia internationally for The Matildas and domestically in both the W-League and the American National Women's Soccer League (NWSL), winning multiple league MVP and Golden Boot titles in both. Kerr and his sister are also more distantly related to two other famous West Australian footballers, Con Regan and Shaun McManus.

Kerr attended Aquinas College, Perth, where he met future teammate Quinten Lynch and several other future AFL players. He was in the East Fremantle Football Club's zone as a teenager, although he did not play at senior WAFL level before being drafted.  He later played two games for East Fremantle in 2011 and three more in 2013.

Football career
Kerr was selected with the number 18 pick in the 2000 AFL Draft. He won Goal of the Year in 2003 and was widely known as one of the toughest players in the AFL.

In 2005, Kerr almost provided one of the biggest upsets in Brownlow Medal history when he led the count towards the later rounds and finished second to favourite, teammate Ben Cousins.

In 2006, he came third in the Brownlow Medal count with 22 votes; however, he was ineligible due to a striking charge against Hawthorn's Sam Mitchell in Round 14. He was also a part of the Eagles' 2006 premiership side and still managed to receive 20 disposals during the game, despite playing with detached ligaments in his foot.

In August of the same year, the much bigger Fraser Gehrig, considered to be one of the strongest players in the AFL, tried to palm off a tackle by Kerr, only to have Kerr resist and re-tackle Gehrig, with the result seeing the umpire reward Kerr with a "holding the ball" decision.

In 2007, Kerr had another great year with the Eagles. He came runner up in the Brownlow Medal for a second time in his career, behind Jimmy Bartel. His physical strength was further demonstrated in Round 1 against the Sydney Swans when he was able to successfully tackle and take down the far bigger Barry Hall in the goalsquare.

Kerr re-signed with the Eagles after weeks of speculation over his future during the 2009 season. In Round 10 of the same season, after an appeal by the Eagles the decision was upheld by the AFL tribunal, Kerr was suspended for one week for striking Carlton's Marc Murphy,.

In 2010, Kerr seriously injured his hamstring in the West Coast Eagles' Round 4 win over Essendon, which ended his season. His absence was felt on the field as the Eagles would win only three more games for the season.

Kerr announced his retirement from AFL football in October 2013. The following month, he hinted that he would like to play football again in the WAFL. Kerr said if he played in the WAFL the following year, it would likely be at a club much closer to his northern suburbs home. However, he eventually decided against returning to the WAFL, but has played country football.

Statistics

|- style="background-color: #EAEAEA"
! scope="row" style="text-align:center" | 2001
|style="text-align:center;"|
| 34 || 19 || 7 || 6 || 147 || 149 || 296 || 38 || 67 || 0.4 || 0.3 || 7.7 || 7.8 || 15.6 || 2.0 || 3.5
|-
! scope="row" style="text-align:center" | 2002
|style="text-align:center;"|
| 4 ||  23 || 20 || 10 || 208 || 203 || 411 || 43 || 75 || 0.9 || 0.4 || 9.0 || 8.8 || 17.9 || 1.9 || 3.3
|- style="background:#eaeaea;"
! scope="row" style="text-align:center" | 2003
|style="text-align:center;"|
| 4 || 21 || 17 || 8 || 203 || 202 || 405 || 54 || 74 || 0.8 || 0.4 || 9.7 || 9.6 || 19.3 || 2.6 || 3.5
|-
! scope="row" style="text-align:center" | 2004
|style="text-align:center;"|
| 4 || 21 || 13 || 8 || 243 || 173 || 416 || 74 || 68 || 0.6 || 0.4 || 11.6 || 8.2 || 19.8 || 3.5 || 3.2
|- style="background:#eaeaea;"
! scope="row" style="text-align:center" | 2005
|style="text-align:center;"|
| 4 || 22 || 8 || 12 || 264 || 196 || 460 || 81 || 59 || 0.4 || 0.5 || 12.0 || 8.9 || 20.9 || 3.7 || 2.7
|-
! scope="row" style="text-align:center" | 2006
|style="text-align:center;"|
| 4 || 21 || 11 || 16 || 233 || 249 || 482 || 61 || 67 || 0.5 || 0.8 || 11.1 || 11.9 || 23.0 || 2.9 || 3.2
|- style="background:#eaeaea;"
! scope="row" style="text-align:center" | 2007
|style="text-align:center;"|
| 4 || 17 || 8 || 11 || 223 || 238 || 461 || 46 || 61 || 0.5 || 0.6 || 13.1 || 14.0 || 27.1 || 2.7 || 3.6
|- 
! scope="row" style="text-align:center" | 2008
|style="text-align:center;"|
| 4 || 11 || 6 || 2 || 131 || 130 || 261 || 24 || 26 || 0.5 || 0.2 || 11.9 || 11.8 || 23.7 || 2.2 || 2.4
|- style="background:#eaeaea;"
! scope="row" style="text-align:center" | 2009
|style="text-align:center;"|
| 4 || 11 || 7 || 3 || 76 || 138 || 214 || 7 || 30 || 0.6 || 0.3 || 6.9 || 12.5 || 19.5 || 0.6 || 2.7
|- 
! scope="row" style="text-align:center" | 2010
|style="text-align:center;"|
| 4 || 4 || 1 || 1 || 24 || 54 || 78 || 3 || 12 || 0.3 || 0.3 || 6.0 || 13.5 || 19.5 || 0.8 || 3.0
|- style="background:#eaeaea;"
! scope="row" style="text-align:center" | 2011
|style="text-align:center;"|
| 4 || 16 || 7 || 8 || 174 || 220 || 394 || 35 || 38 || 0.4 || 0.5 || 10.9 || 13.8 || 24.6 || 2.2 || 2.4
|- 
! scope="row" style="text-align:center" | 2012
|style="text-align:center;"|
| 4 ||  24 || 13 || 8 || 291 || 261 || 552 || 56 || 53 || 0.5 || 0.3 || 12.1 || 10.9 || 23.0 || 2.3 || 2.2
|- style="background:#eaeaea;"
! scope="row" style="text-align:center" | 2013
|style="text-align:center;"|
| 4 || 10 || 4 || 0 || 95 || 112 || 207 || 17 || 27 || 0.4 || 0.0 || 9.5 || 11.2 || 20.7 || 1.7 || 2.7
|- class="sortbottom"
! colspan=3| Career
! 220
! 122
! 93
! 2312
! 2325
! 4637
! 539
! 657
! 0.6
! 0.4
! 10.5
! 10.6
! 21.1
! 2.5
! 3.0
|}
Source:

Personal life 
In May 2009, Kerr became engaged to his girlfriend of nearly two years, Natasha Pozo. They were married at Aquinas College, Salter Point in January 2010. In 2011, they welcomed their first child, a daughter. They had their second child, another daughter, in 2012. In January 2014, it was announced that Kerr and Pozo had separated. They are now divorced.

In 2017 Kerr and partner Michelle McAtackney welcomed their first child together. This is the first child for McAtackney and third for Kerr.

Off-field controversies
In September 2002, Kerr was involved in a brawl with teammate Ben Cousins at a Perth nightclub during the club's end of season celebrations. Later the same night, after Cousins had previously punched Kerr in the face, Kerr then pushed Cousins down a flight of stairs, breaking his arm.

In 2004, Kerr was charged with forging a prescription. He was given the blank prescription by a person at a party and went to a 24-hour chemist to buy 50 valium tablets. The court fined him a total of $400 and made a spent conviction order. He was also fined $5,000 by the club and was required to complete community service throughout the football season.

In mid-2005, Kerr and teammate Michael Gardiner were observed behaving erratically in a nightclub by members of an opposition team following a match. They believed the two had taken illicit drugs while in the toilets.

In January 2007, Kerr and his father were charged with assault following a party in Perth. Kerr is understood to have been at a farewell party for his sister's friend in Attadale before trouble erupted shortly after midnight. Reports suggested that Kerr's sister complained about being touched inappropriately by another partygoer and a fight erupted soon after on the street. An 18-year-old man suffered a broken nose and broken tooth. Kerr was charged with two counts of assault occasioning bodily harm. He pleaded guilty to assault occasioning bodily harm and was fined $2000 over the attack. His father was also fined after being found guilty of assault.

In February 2007, Kerr was arrested and charged with disorderly conduct after an altercation with a taxi driver. He was later arrested again while at a training session, and further charged with assault occasioning bodily harm and willful damage. Police prosecutor Gary Flynn told the court Kerr saw the taxi and jumped screaming and shouting onto the boot. The taxi driver got out of his car and was attacked by Kerr, Sgt Flynn said. Kerr's lawyer John Prior said his client had gone out to dinner, "consumed too much alcohol" and "made a crucial bad judgement call". Kerr pleaded guilty to the charges and was fined.

In March 2007, information was released that implicated Kerr and former Eagle Aaron Edwards in drug dealing over the phone. His conversations with convicted drug dealer Shane Waters relating to a "big bag of horse chaff" were recorded by police phone taps in 2003.

In September 2007, Kerr was alleged to have abused staff at a Melbourne hotel on the day of the AFLPA awards. His club were informed of the incident, and when they came to check on Kerr at 2pm, he was still in bed. They observed he was hungover and blamed the incident on alcohol rather than drugs.

The West Coast Eagles forced Kerr to start seeing a clinical psychologist at the beginning of 2008, in an attempt to combat his anger management issues and alcoholism.

In April 2010, Kerr was ordered by the Criminal Injuries Compensation Tribunal to pay $13,125 to teenager Troy Luies, after Luies filed a claim for the injuries he suffered at the Kerr's hands on 14 January 2007. Assessor William Millar awarded Luies compensation for the assault by Kerr, as payment for his hospital bills, lost pay and for trauma suffered.

In November 2014, Kerr was arrested and charged with endangering the lives of two people after he allegedly started a small fire at a house in Glendalough. He spent five nights at Hakea Prison before being released on bail when his parents paid the $5000 surety.

Kerr was charged with aggravated stalking and breaching a violence restraining order on 19 August 2020.  On 16 September 2020 he was charged with historical domestic violence charges. On 17 February 2021 Kerr was charged with criminal damage by fire after a fire damaged the rear of his Kardinya house. He denied responsibility for the fire, but as he was already on bail for the previous charges, his bail was revoked.

References

External links

 
 

1983 births
Living people
All-Australians (AFL)
Australian people of Anglo-Indian descent
Australian sportspeople of Indian descent
Anglo-Indian people
East Fremantle Football Club players
People educated at Aquinas College, Perth
Australian rules footballers from Perth, Western Australia
West Coast Eagles players
West Coast Eagles Premiership players
Australia international rules football team players
One-time VFL/AFL Premiership players